Tatjana Maria was the defending champion, but withdrew before the event started. 

Kirsten Flipkens won the title, defeating wildcard Katie Boulter in the final, 6–4, 5–7, 6–3.

Seeds

Draw

Draw

References
Main Draw

Fuzion 100 Southsea Trophy - Singles
Southsea Trophy